The following species in the flowering plant genus Centaurea are accepted by Plants of the World Online. Species in this genus hybridize readily.

Centaurea acaulis 
Centaurea achaia 
Centaurea achtarovii 
Centaurea acicularis 
Centaurea acmophylla 
Centaurea adamovicii 
Centaurea aegyptiaca 
Centaurea × aellenii 
Centaurea aeolica 
Centaurea aetaliae 
Centaurea aetolica 
Centaurea affinis 
Centaurea aggregata 
Centaurea aguilellae 
Centaurea ahverdovii 
Centaurea ainetensis 
Centaurea akamantis 
Centaurea akmanii 
Centaurea akroteriensis 
Centaurea aksoyi 
Centaurea aladaghensis 
Centaurea alba 
Centaurea albertii 
Centaurea albofimbriata 
Centaurea albonitens 
Centaurea alexandrina 
Centaurea alfonsoi 
Centaurea ali-beyana 
Centaurea alveicola 
Centaurea amadanensis 
Centaurea amaena 
Centaurea amanicola 
Centaurea amanosensis 
Centaurea ambigua 
Centaurea amblensis 
Centaurea ammocyanus 
Centaurea angelescui 
Centaurea antalyensis 
Centaurea antennata 
Centaurea anthemifolia 
Centaurea antiochia 
Centaurea antitauri 
Centaurea aphrodisea 
Centaurea aplolepa 
Centaurea appendicata 
Centaurea arachnoidea 
Centaurea ardabilica 
Centaurea arenaria 
Centaurea argentea 
Centaurea arifolia 
Centaurea aristata 
Centaurea armena 
Centaurea arrigonii 
Centaurea ascalonica 
Centaurea aspera 
Centaurea aspromontana 
Centaurea assadii 
Centaurea athoa 
Centaurea atlantica 
Centaurea atlantis 
Centaurea atropurpurea 
Centaurea attica 
Centaurea aucheri 
Centaurea × austriacoides 
Centaurea austroanatolica 
Centaurea avilae 
Centaurea axillaris 
Centaurea aytugiana 
Centaurea aziziana 
Centaurea babylonica 
Centaurea bachtiarica 
Centaurea baldaccii 
Centaurea baseri 
Centaurea bavegehensis 
Centaurea × beckiana 
Centaurea behen 
Centaurea benedicta 
Centaurea besseriana 
Centaurea bethurica 
Centaurea bimorpha 
Centaurea bingoelensis 
Centaurea biokovensis 
Centaurea blancheana 
Centaurea bofilliana 
Centaurea boissieri 
Centaurea bojnordensis 
Centaurea bombycina 
Centaurea borjae 
Centaurea borysthenica 
Centaurea bourgaei 
Centaurea bovina 
Centaurea breviceps 
Centaurea bruguieriana 
Centaurea brulla 
Centaurea bugellensis 
Centaurea busambarensis 
Centaurea cadmea 
Centaurea calabra 
Centaurea calcitrapa 
Centaurea caliacrae 
Centaurea calocephala 
Centaurea calolepis 
Centaurea camelorum 
Centaurea cankiriensis 
Centaurea caprina 
Centaurea carduiformis 
Centaurea cariensiformis 
Centaurea cariensis 
Centaurea caroli-henrici 
Centaurea carolipauana 
Centaurea carratracensis 
Centaurea carystea 
Centaurea caspia 
Centaurea cassia 
Centaurea castellana 
Centaurea castellanoides 
Centaurea × castellano-manchensis 
Centaurea cataonica 
Centaurea cavanillesiana 
Centaurea × ceballosii 
Centaurea centauroides 
Centaurea × cephalariseptimae 
Centaurea ceratophylla 
Centaurea chalcidicea 
Centaurea charrelii 
Centaurea cheiranthifolia 
Centaurea cheirolepidoides 
Centaurea cheirolopha 
Centaurea chrysantha 
Centaurea chrysocephala 
Centaurea chrysolepis 
Centaurea cineraria 
Centaurea cithaeronea 
Centaurea citricolor 
Centaurea clementei 
Centaurea codringtonii 
Centaurea codruensis
Centaurea collina 
Centaurea conocephala 
Centaurea consanguinea 
Centaurea corcubionensis 
Centaurea cordubensis 
Centaurea corensis 
Centaurea coronata 
Centaurea corymbosa 
Centaurea coziensis 
Centaurea cristata 
Centaurea crithmifolia 
Centaurea crnogorica 
Centaurea cuneifolia 
Centaurea cuspidata 
Centaurea cyanoides 
Centaurea cyanomorpha 
Centaurea cyanus 
Centaurea cylindrocephala 
Centaurea cyprensis 
Centaurea cyrenaica 
Centaurea dalmatica 
Centaurea damascena 
Centaurea daralagoezica 
Centaurea davisii 
Centaurea debdouensis 
Centaurea debeauxii 
Centaurea decipiens 
Centaurea degeniana 
Centaurea degenianiformis
Centaurea delbesiana 
Centaurea delicatula 
Centaurea delucae 
Centaurea demetrii 
Centaurea demirizii 
Centaurea demirkapiensis 
Centaurea depressa 
Centaurea derderiifolia 
Centaurea derventana 
Centaurea deusta 
Centaurea deustiformis 
Centaurea dhofarica 
Centaurea dichroa 
Centaurea dichroantha 
Centaurea diffusa 
Centaurea diluta 
Centaurea diomedea 
Centaurea djebel-amouri 
Centaurea doddsii 
Centaurea dominii 
Centaurea donetzica 
Centaurea × doumerguei 
Centaurea drabifolia 
Centaurea drabifolioides 
Centaurea drenovensis 
Centaurea dubjanskyi 
Centaurea ducellieri 
Centaurea dumanii 
Centaurea dumulosa 
Centaurea dursunbeyensis 
Centaurea ebenoides 
Centaurea × eclipsislunae 
Centaurea edith-mariae
Centaurea eflanensis 
Centaurea elazigensis 
Centaurea elbrusensis 
Centaurea elegantissima 
Centaurea eliasii 
Centaurea emigrantis 
Centaurea emiliae 
Centaurea emporitana 
Centaurea ensiformis 
Centaurea epapposa 
Centaurea epirota 
Centaurea erinacella 
Centaurea eriophora 
Centaurea ertugruliana 
Centaurea erycina 
Centaurea eryngioides 
Centaurea esfandiarii 
Centaurea euboica 
Centaurea euxina 
Centaurea exarata 
Centaurea × extranea 
Centaurea fabregatii 
Centaurea farsistanica 
Centaurea fenzlii 
Centaurea ferox 
Centaurea filiformis 
Centaurea finazzeri 
Centaurea flosculosa 
Centaurea × forsythiana 
Centaurea foucauldiana 
Centaurea foveolata 
Centaurea fragilis 
Centaurea francoi 
Centaurea friderici 
Centaurea furfuracea 
Centaurea fuscomarginata 
Centaurea fusiformis 
Centaurea gabrieliae 
Centaurea gabrielis-blancae 
Centaurea gabrieljanae 
Centaurea gadorensis 
Centaurea galicicae 
Centaurea gattefossei 
Centaurea geluensis 
Centaurea × genesii-lopezii 
Centaurea gentilii 
Centaurea gerberi 
Centaurea gerhardii 
Centaurea germanicopolitana 
Centaurea ghahremanii 
Centaurea giardinae 
Centaurea gigantea 
Centaurea gjurasinii 
Centaurea glaberrima 
Centaurea glabroauriculata 
Centaurea glastifolia 
Centaurea globurensis 
Centaurea glomerata 
Centaurea gloriosa
Centaurea goerkii 
Centaurea goksivriensis 
Centaurea golestanica 
Centaurea gracilenta 
Centaurea graeca 
Centaurea × grafiana 
Centaurea graminifolia 
Centaurea granatensis 
Centaurea grbavacensis 
Centaurea greuteri 
Centaurea grisebachii 
Centaurea × grosii 
Centaurea gubanovii 
Centaurea gudrunensis 
Centaurea gulissashvilii 
Centaurea gussonei 
Centaurea gymnocarpa 
Centaurea hadacii 
Centaurea haenseleri 
Centaurea hakkariensis 
Centaurea halophila 
Centaurea handelii 
Centaurea hanryi 
Centaurea haradjianii 
Centaurea haussknechtii 
Centaurea haynaldiiformis
Centaurea heldreichii 
Centaurea helenioides 
Centaurea hellwigii 
Centaurea heratensis 
Centaurea hermannii 
Centaurea herminii 
Centaurea hervieri 
Centaurea heterocarpa 
Centaurea hierapolitana 
Centaurea hohenackeri 
Centaurea hololeuca 
Centaurea homoeosceros 
Centaurea horrida 
Centaurea huetii 
Centaurea huljakii 
Centaurea hyalolepis 
Centaurea hymettia 
Centaurea hyrcanica 
Centaurea hyssopifolia 
Centaurea iberica 
Centaurea ibn-tattoui 
Centaurea idaea 
Centaurea ilvensis 
Centaurea immanuelis-loewii 
Centaurea imperialis 
Centaurea incompleta 
Centaurea incompta 
Centaurea indistincta 
Centaurea inermis 
Centaurea inexpectata 
Centaurea inexpugnabilis 
Centaurea infestans 
Centaurea integrans 
Centaurea intricata 
Centaurea involucrata 
Centaurea ionica 
Centaurea ipecensis 
Centaurea iranshahrii 
Centaurea irritans 
Centaurea isaurica 
Centaurea ispahanica 
Centaurea jacea 
Centaurea × jaceiformis 
Centaurea jaennensis 
Centaurea janeri 
Centaurea jankae 
Centaurea jankeana 
Centaurea japygica 
Centaurea jeffreyana 
Centaurea jiroftensis 
Centaurea joharchii 
Centaurea johnseniana 
Centaurea jordaniana 
Centaurea josiae 
Centaurea jovinianum 
Centaurea jurineifolia 
Centaurea × juvenalis 
Centaurea kabirkuhensis 
Centaurea kalambakensis 
Centaurea kamalnejadii 
Centaurea kamyaranensis 
Centaurea kandavanensis 
Centaurea kanitziana 
Centaurea karamianiae 
Centaurea kartschiana 
Centaurea karvandarensis 
Centaurea kavadarensis 
Centaurea kaynakiae 
Centaurea kemulariae 
Centaurea kermanshahensis 
Centaurea kerneriana 
Centaurea khosraviana 
Centaurea kilaea 
Centaurea kirmacii 
Centaurea kizildaghensis 
Centaurea × kleinii 
Centaurea kochiana 
Centaurea koeieana 
Centaurea konkae 
Centaurea kosaninii 
Centaurea kotschyana 
Centaurea kotschyi 
Centaurea kozjakensis
Centaurea kunkelii 
Centaurea × kupcsokiana 
Centaurea kurdica 
Centaurea kusanii
Centaurea lacaitae 
Centaurea lacerata 
Centaurea laconica 
Centaurea lactiflora 
Centaurea lactucifolia 
Centaurea lagascana 
Centaurea lainzii 
Centaurea lancifolia 
Centaurea langei 
Centaurea lanigera 
Centaurea lanulata 
Centaurea latiloba 
Centaurea laureotica 
Centaurea lavrenkoana 
Centaurea laxa 
Centaurea legionis-septimae 
Centaurea leonidia 
Centaurea leptophylla 
Centaurea leucadea 
Centaurea leucomalla 
Centaurea leucomelaena 
Centaurea leucophaea 
Centaurea limbata 
Centaurea lingulata 
Centaurea linifolia 
Centaurea litardierei 
Centaurea litigiosa 
Centaurea litochorea 
Centaurea longepedunculata 
Centaurea longifimbriata 
Centaurea longispina 
Centaurea loscosii 
Centaurea lugdunensis 
Centaurea luristanica 
Centaurea luschaniana 
Centaurea lycaonica 
Centaurea lycia 
Centaurea lycopifolia 
Centaurea lydia 
Centaurea macedonica 
Centaurea macroacantha 
Centaurea macrocephala 
Centaurea macroptilon 
Centaurea magistrorum 
Centaurea magocsyana 
Centaurea maireana 
Centaurea × mairei 
Centaurea majorovii 
Centaurea malatyensis 
Centaurea malinvaldiana 
Centaurea mannagettae 
Centaurea maramarosiensis 
Centaurea marashica 
Centaurea margarita-alba 
Centaurea margaritacea 
Centaurea mariana 
Centaurea × maritima 
Centaurea marmorea 
Centaurea maroccana 
Centaurea masjedsoleymanensis 
Centaurea matthiolifolia 
Centaurea mayeri
Centaurea melanocephala 
Centaurea melanosticta 
Centaurea melitensis 
Centaurea mersinensis 
Centaurea mesopotamica 
Centaurea messenicolasiana 
Centaurea micevskii 
Centaurea micracantha 
Centaurea micrantha 
Centaurea microcarpa 
Centaurea microcnicus 
Centaurea microlonchoides 
Centaurea microlopha 
Centaurea molesworthiae 
Centaurea mollis 
Centaurea × moncktonii 
Centaurea monodii 
Centaurea montaltensis 
Centaurea montana 
Centaurea monticola 
Centaurea montis-borlae 
Centaurea mouterdei 
Centaurea movlavia 
Centaurea mozaffarianii 
Centaurea mucurensis 
Centaurea murbeckii 
Centaurea musakii 
Centaurea musarum 
Centaurea musimonum 
Centaurea × mutabilis 
Centaurea nallihanensis 
Centaurea nana 
Centaurea napifolia 
Centaurea napulifera 
Centaurea neicevii 
Centaurea nemecii 
Centaurea nemoralis 
Centaurea nerimaniae 
Centaurea nervosa 
Centaurea nevadensis 
Centaurea nicolai 
Centaurea niederi 
Centaurea nigerica 
Centaurea nigra 
Centaurea nigrescens 
Centaurea nigrofimbria 
Centaurea nissana 
Centaurea nivea 
Centaurea nobilis 
Centaurea × noguerensis 
Centaurea × nouelii 
Centaurea novakii 
Centaurea × numantina 
Centaurea nydeggeri 
Centaurea obtusifolia 
Centaurea obtusiloba 
Centaurea occasus 
Centaurea ochrocephala 
Centaurea odessana 
Centaurea odyssei 
Centaurea ognjanoffii 
Centaurea oltensis 
Centaurea olympica 
Centaurea omphalodes 
Centaurea onopordifolia 
Centaurea oranensis 
Centaurea orbelica 
Centaurea orientalis 
Centaurea oriolii-bolosii 
Centaurea ornata 
Centaurea orphanidea 
Centaurea orumiehensis 
Centaurea oscensis 
Centaurea ossaea 
Centaurea ovina 
Centaurea oxylepis 
Centaurea pabotii 
Centaurea paczoskyi 
Centaurea palanganensis 
Centaurea pallescens 
Centaurea pamphylica 
Centaurea pangaea 
Centaurea paniculata 
Centaurea panormitana 
Centaurea paphlagonica 
Centaurea papposa 
Centaurea × paredensis 
Centaurea parilica 
Centaurea parlatoris 
Centaurea parviflora 
Centaurea patula 
Centaurea × paucispina 
Centaurea paui 
Centaurea pauneroi 
Centaurea pawlowskii 
Centaurea paxorum 
Centaurea pectinata 
Centaurea pelia 
Centaurea pentadactyli 
Centaurea perrottettii 
Centaurea persica 
Centaurea pestalotii 
Centaurea pestalozzae 
Centaurea peucedanifolia 
Centaurea phaeolepis 
Centaurea phlomoides 
Centaurea phrygia 
Centaurea pichleri 
Centaurea pinae 
Centaurea pinardi 
Centaurea pindicola 
Centaurea pineticola 
Centaurea pinetorum 
Centaurea × pinillosii 
Centaurea pinnata 
Centaurea pinnatifida 
Centaurea poculatoris 
Centaurea podospermifolia 
Centaurea poeltiana 
Centaurea polyclada 
Centaurea polymorpha 
Centaurea polyphylla 
Centaurea polypodiifolia 
Centaurea pomeliana 
Centaurea pontica
Centaurea postii 
Centaurea praecox 
Centaurea princeps 
Centaurea procurrens 
Centaurea prolongi 
Centaurea proto-gerberi 
Centaurea proto-margaritacea 
Centaurea pseudoaxillaris 
Centaurea pseudobovina 
Centaurea pseudocadmea 
Centaurea pseudocineraria 
Centaurea pseudodegeniana
Centaurea pseudokotschyi 
Centaurea pseudoleucolepis 
Centaurea pseudomaculosa 
Centaurea pseudomagocsyana
Centaurea pseudoscabiosa 
Centaurea pseudosinaica 
Centaurea pseudreflexa 
Centaurea psilacantha 
Centaurea ptarmicifolia 
Centaurea pterocaula 
Centaurea ptosimopappa 
Centaurea ptosimopappoides 
Centaurea pubescens 
Centaurea pugioniformis 
Centaurea pulchella 
Centaurea pullata 
Centaurea pulvinata 
Centaurea pungens 
Centaurea radichii 
Centaurea ragusina 
Centaurea rahiminejadii 
Centaurea raimondoi 
Centaurea raphanina 
Centaurea ravansarensis 
Centaurea rechingeri 
Centaurea redempta 
Centaurea reducta 
Centaurea reflexa 
Centaurea regia 
Centaurea reichenbachii 
Centaurea resupinata 
Centaurea reuteriana 
Centaurea rhaetica 
Centaurea rhizantha 
Centaurea rhizocalathium 
Centaurea rigida 
Centaurea rivasmateoi 
Centaurea ropalon 
Centaurea × rossiana 
Centaurea rouyi 
Centaurea rufidula 
Centaurea rumelica 
Centaurea rupestris 
Centaurea rutifolia 
Centaurea saccensis 
Centaurea sagredoi 
Centaurea sakarensis 
Centaurea sakariyaensis 
Centaurea saligna 
Centaurea salmasensis 
Centaurea salonitana 
Centaurea samothracica 
Centaurea sanandajensis 
Centaurea × sanchisiana 
Centaurea sarandinakiae 
Centaurea sarfattiana 
Centaurea savranica 
Centaurea saxicola 
Centaurea saxifraga 
Centaurea scabiosa 
Centaurea scannensis 
Centaurea schimperi 
Centaurea schousboei 
Centaurea scillae 
Centaurea sclerolepis 
Centaurea scoparia 
Centaurea scopulorum 
Centaurea scripczinskyi 
Centaurea seguenzae 
Centaurea semidecurrens 
Centaurea semiusta 
Centaurea senegalensis 
Centaurea sennikoviana 
Centaurea sericea 
Centaurea seridis 
Centaurea serpentinica 
Centaurea shahuensis 
Centaurea shehbazii 
Centaurea shouilea 
Centaurea shumkana 
Centaurea sicana 
Centaurea sicula 
Centaurea sieheana 
Centaurea × similata 
Centaurea simonkaiana 
Centaurea simulans 
Centaurea sinaica 
Centaurea singarensis 
Centaurea sintenisiana 
Centaurea sipylea 
Centaurea sirdjanica 
Centaurea sivasica 
Centaurea skopjensis 
Centaurea solitaria 
Centaurea solstitialis 
Centaurea sophiae 
Centaurea × soriana 
Centaurea soskae 
Centaurea speciosa 
Centaurea spectabilis 
Centaurea sphaerocephala 
Centaurea spicata 
Centaurea spinosa 
Centaurea spinosociliata 
Centaurea spruneri 
Centaurea × spuria 
Centaurea stapfiana 
Centaurea stereophylla 
Centaurea sterilis 
Centaurea steveniana 
Centaurea stevenii 
Centaurea stoebe 
Centaurea stricta 
Centaurea stuessyi 
Centaurea subjacea 
Centaurea subsericans 
Centaurea subtilis 
Centaurea sulphurea 
Centaurea susannae 
Centaurea tabriziana 
Centaurea tadshicorum 
Centaurea takhtajanii 
Centaurea takredensis 
Centaurea tanaitica 
Centaurea tardiflora 
Centaurea tauromenitana 
Centaurea tauscheri 
Centaurea tchihatcheffii 
Centaurea tenacissima 
Centaurea tenoreana 
Centaurea tenorei 
Centaurea thasia 
Centaurea theryi 
Centaurea thessala 
Centaurea thirkei 
Centaurea thracica 
Centaurea thuillieri 
Centaurea toletana 
Centaurea tomentella 
Centaurea tommasinii 
Centaurea tomorosii 
Centaurea torreana 
Centaurea tossiensis 
Centaurea tougourensis 
Centaurea trachonitica 
Centaurea transcaucasica 
Centaurea × trauttmannii 
Centaurea treskana 
Centaurea triamularia 
Centaurea trichocephala 
Centaurea triniifolia 
Centaurea tripontina 
Centaurea triumfettii 
Centaurea tuntasia 
Centaurea turkestanica 
Centaurea tuzgoluensis 
Centaurea tymphaea 
Centaurea ugamica 
Centaurea ulrichiorum 
Centaurea ultreiae 
Centaurea uniflora 
Centaurea urgellensis 
Centaurea urvillei 
Centaurea ustulata 
Centaurea uysalii 
Centaurea valesiaca 
Centaurea vandasii 
Centaurea vanensis 
Centaurea vankovii 
Centaurea varnensis 
Centaurea vatevii 
Centaurea vavilovii 
Centaurea veneris 
Centaurea vermia 
Centaurea vermiculigera 
Centaurea verutum 
Centaurea vesceritensis 
Centaurea virgata 
Centaurea visianiana 
Centaurea vlachorum 
Centaurea wagenitzii 
Centaurea wallichiana 
Centaurea wendelboi 
Centaurea werneri 
Centaurea wettsteinii 
Centaurea wiedemanniana 
Centaurea wolgensis 
Centaurea woronowii 
Centaurea xaveri 
Centaurea xerolepida 
Centaurea xylobasis 
Centaurea yaltirikii 
Centaurea yemensis 
Centaurea yozgatensis 
Centaurea zaferii 
Centaurea zagrosmontana 
Centaurea zangulensis 
Centaurea zarrei 
Centaurea zeybekii 
Centaurea ziganensis 
Centaurea zlatarskyana 
Centaurea zlatiborensis 
Centaurea × zubiae 
Centaurea zuccariniana

References

Centaurea